Sagardighi Thermal Power Station is a thermal power plant located at Manigram, 13 km north of Sagardighi in the Indian state of West Bengal. The power plant is operated by the West Bengal Power Development Corporation Limited.

Geography

Location

It is on the western bank of the Bhagirathi.

Note: The map alongside presents some of the notable locations in a part of the subdivision. All places marked in the map are linked in the larger full screen map.

The project
The project was developed by the Chinese firm, Dongfang Electric Corporation, at a cost of Rs. 27.50 billion. The power plant had provided employment for about 2,000 people. The state government had acquired  of land without resistance.2x300MW & 2x500MW total generation now is 1600. Another 1x660MW is planned for which EPC contract has been to awarded to public sector engineering major BHEL at cost of around INR 3500 crore.

Capacity 
The Thermal Power Station has a planned capacity of 1600 MW; 2 units of 300 MW each and 2 units of 500 MW each.

References

Coal-fired power stations in West Bengal
Buildings and structures in Murshidabad district
Energy infrastructure completed in 2008
2008 establishments in West Bengal